Mr. President is a musical with a book by Howard Lindsay and Russel Crouse and music and lyrics by Irving Berlin.  The story focuses on fictional  US President Stephen Decatur Henderson, who runs into political trouble following a disastrous trip to the Soviet Union and his problems with his children. Bored with life as a civilian after his presidency ends, he decides to return to political life.

The original 1962 Broadway production ran for 265 performances.  The show was Irving Berlin's last musical.

Productions
The musical had its first out-of-town tryout in Boston beginning on August 27, 1962 and was coolly received. After extensive cuts and revisions, it was given another tryout at the National Theatre in Washington, DC, on September 25, 1962 which was attended by President John F. Kennedy and First Lady Jacqueline Kennedy. The first couple congratulated Berlin on a hit. Kennedy later sent his aides, Kenneth P. O'Donnell and David Powers, to apologize to Berlin for his having to leave the performance early. This day of Kennedy's presidency is the one featured in an exhibit at the JFK Museum and Library. The Washington reviews "were lukewarm and even negative. The word 'corny' stuck, and was repeated again and again."

After four previews, the Broadway production, directed by Joshua Logan and choreographed by Peter Gennaro, opened on October 20, 1962 at the St. James Theatre, where it ran for 265 performances. The cast included Robert Ryan, Nanette Fabray, Jack Haskell, Anita Gillette and Baayork Lee. The musical premiered in a Broadway season dominated by hits like Oliver!, A Funny Thing Happened on the Way to the Forum and Stop the World – I Want to Get Off. Mr. President received unenthusiastic reviews. Although Berlin's score was praised, the show "was just too old-fashioned and out of date." Berlin continued to work, revising Annie Get Your Gun and writing songs, such as for the film project Say It With Music (which was never produced), but "Broadway would never again see a truly Berlin work on the stage". Mr. President was the final Lindsay and Crouse collaboration.<ref>Magee, Jeffrey. "Irving Berlin's American Musical Theater, Oxford University Press, 2012, pp. 298, 300</ref>

In 1964, former President Harry S. Truman made an opening night cameo appearance in a production of the show at the Starlight Theatre in Kansas City. He left by ambulance at intermission due to an appendicitis attack.

Gerard Alessandrini extensively revised the book and converted the plot into a spoof of the 2000 Presidential election debacle. After thirty previews, it opened on August 2, 2001 at the Off-Broadway Douglas Fairbanks Theater where, hampered by reviews worse than those received by the original, it closed after only ten performances. Ben Brantley, in his review for The New York Times, wrote that the musical "feels tired". However, the TheaterMania reviewers noted that, while "the overall tenor of the satire here is soft," it has "surprisingly buoyant appeal. It remains bubbly and effervescent thanks to the peppy, imaginative direction supplied by the team of John Znidarsic and Alessandrini."

Synopsis
President Stephen Decatur Henderson is a true patriot and loves his family.  His daughter Leslie has recently had a series of romantic liaisons, some liberal and some conservative.  Her newest romance is with Youssein Davair, the son of a Middle Eastern ruler; the sincerity of his affection is questionable.  Pat Gregory, a Secret Service agent, has watched Leslie grow up and has fallen in love with her but doesn't believe that she could be interested in a simple guy like him. With the Cold War as a backdrop, Henderson, together with Nell, his First Lady, and their children go on a "good-will tour" of Europe, including the Soviet Union. Henderson gets in trouble for jokingly comparing the Soviet leader to a "wild cat". But the President lands in Moscow anyhow and gives a conciliatory and humanizing speech, assisted by his Russian-speaking son Larry, that earns the respect of the Soviets. Nevertheless, back at home, the gaffe plagues him and hurts his party's popularity. Larry is a bit of a hot-head and punches the party chairman on TV to defend his father. The presidential term of office ends, and the Hendersons leave the White House.

In Act II, Henderson finds his post-politics life in Ohio mundane.  The family is invited to a party at the White House, and there Leslie finds that Youssein is now interested in Betty Chandler, the daughter of the new President, and so they break up. Leslie leaves the party with Pat. Meanwhile, one of Ohio's senators dies, and the governor asks Henderson to finish his term of office. Henderson yearns to return to public life, but he questions the governor's motives and declines the job. Soon afterwards, however, another opportunity comes: the new President asks Henderson to attend an international summit meeting on behalf of the US, because of the respect that he commands in the Soviet Union.

Roles and original cast
Robert Ryan – President Stephen Decatur Henderson
Nanette Fabray – First Lady Nell Henderson
David Brooks – Manager; Governor Harmon Bardahl
Wisa D'Orso – Princess Kyra
Charlotte Fairchild – Tippy Taylor (a secretary)
Anita Gillette – Leslie Henderson (First Daughter)
Stanley Grover – Charley Wayne (of the Secret Service)
Jack Haskell – Pat Gregory (of the Secret Service)	
John Cecil Holm – Chester Kincaid
Jerry Strickler – Larry Henderson (First Son)
Jack Washburn – Youssein Davair (Son of a Middle Eastern ruler)
Baayork Lee – Deborah Chakronin
Carol Lee Jensen – Betty Chandler (new First Daughter'')

Musical numbers

Act I
 Let's Go Back to the Waltz – Nell and Ensemble
 In Our Hide-Away – Nell and Steve
 The First Lady – Nell
 Meat and Potatoes – Pat and Charley
 I've Got to Be Around – Pat
 The Secret Service – Leslie
 It Gets Lonely in the White House – Steve
 Is He the Only Man in the World? – Nell and Leslie
 They Love Me – Nell
 Pigtails and Freckles – Pat and Leslie
 Don't Be Afraid of Romance – Youssein
 Laugh It Up – Nell, Steve, Leslie and Larry
 Empty Pockets Filled with Love – Pat and Leslie
 In Our Hide-Away (reprise) – Nell and Steve

Act II
 Glad to Be Home – Nell and Ensemble
 Laugh It Up (reprise) – Nell and Steve
 You Need a Hobby – Nell and Steve
 Don't Be Afraid of Romance (reprise) – Youssein
 The Washington Twist – Leslie and Dancers
 Pigtails and Freckles (reprise) – Pat
 The Only Dance I Know – Princess Kyra
 Meat and Potatoes (reprise) – Pat
 Is He the Only Man in the World? (reprise) – Leslie
 I'm Gonna Get Him – Nell and Leslie
 This Is a Great Country – Steve
 Finale – Company

Awards and nominations

Original Broadway production

References

External links

Musicals by Irving Berlin
1962 musicals
Broadway musicals
Musicals by Lindsay and Crouse
Tony Award-winning musicals